Peace Oil may refer to:

Peace Oil (UK), brand of olive oil marketed in the UK, stated to be "produced in Israel by Jews, Arabs, Druze and Bedouin working together"
Peace Oil (United States), American brand of olive oil marketed in cooperation with Israeli and Palestinian Fair Trade groups